1914 The Hartlepools by-election was held on 22 September 1914.  The by-election was held due to the death of the incumbent Liberal MP, Sir Stephen Furness.  It was won by the 67-year old Liberal candidate Sir Walter Runciman who was unopposed due to a War-time electoral pact.

Result

References

1914 elections in the United Kingdom
1914 in England
20th century in County Durham
Politics of the Borough of Hartlepool
By-elections to the Parliament of the United Kingdom in County Durham constituencies
Unopposed by-elections to the Parliament of the United Kingdom in English constituencies
September 1914 events